Handball at the 2018 Asian Games was held at the POPKI Sports Hall, Jakarta, Indonesia, from 13 August to 31 August 2018. In this tournament, 13 teams participated in the men's competition while 10 teams participated in the women's competition.

Schedule

Medalists

Medal table

Draw
The draw for the competition was done at the JS Luwansa Hotel, Jakarta on 5 July 2018. The draw was conducted by Indonesian Asian Games Organizing Committee (Inasgoc) in the presence of Asian Handball Federation events officer. The teams were seeded based on their final ranking at the 2014 Asian Games.

Men

Group A
 (1)
 (4)

Group B
 (2)
 (9)

Group C
 (Host)
 (7)
 (11)

Group D
 (3)
 (8)
 (14)

Women

Group A
 (1)
 (3)
 (4)
 (8)

Group B
 (Host)
 (2)
 (6)
 (7)

Final standing

Men

Women

References

External links
Handball at the 2018 Asian Games
Official Result Book – Handball

 
2018 Asian Games events
2018
Asian Games
2018 Asian Games